= Tirlta Station =

Pastoral lease in New South Wales

Tirlta Station is a Cattle station 100 km northeast of Broken Hill.

Tirlta is at 31º 14' 35.7" S 142º 05' 18.93" E, making it one of the westernmost homesteads in New South Wales. The nearest ocean is the Southern Ocean about 420 km west-southwest of Tirlta. The station has a Köppen climate classification of BWh (Hot desert). The station is almost unpopulated, with less than two inhabitants per square kilometre. The nearest more populous place is the city of Broken Hill, New South Wales which is 100 km away.
